This article lists the Canadian number-one albums of 1971. The chart was compiled and published by RPM every Saturday.

The top position (December 26, 1970, Vol. 14, No. 19) preceding January 9, 1971 (Vol. 14, No. 20-21) was George Harrison's All Things Must Pass. Five acts held the top position in the albums and singles charts simultaneously: George Harrison on January 9 – 16, The Rolling Stones on June 12 – 19, Carole King on July 10 – 24, Paul and Linda McCartney on September 18 and Rod Stewart on October 9. The eponymous Santana album, often referred to as Santana III to avoid confusion with their likewise eponymous debut album, was listed as New Santana.)

(Entries with dates marked thus* are not presently on record at Library and Archives Canada and were inferred from the following week's listing.)

References

See also
1971 in music
RPM number-one hits of 1971

1971
1971 in Canadian music